Hannover-Kleefeld is a railway station located in Kleefeld (de), Hannover, Germany. The station is located on the Hanover–Brunswick railway.

Overview
The station has one side platform, which is partly covered. The platform can be reached by stairs and an elevator from a small square on the north side of the tracks. This square is used to drop people off and connects to Berckhusenstraße, where the station's bus stop is. Uhlhornstraße, on the south side of the tracks, is also accessible from the station via a pedestrian tunnel. Around the station there are a couple of bicycle sheds.

Train services
The train services are operated by Deutsche Bahn as part of the Hanover S-Bahn. Hannover-Kleefeld is served by the S3 and S7.

References

Kleefeld
Hannover S-Bahn stations